Coronet Films (also known as Coronet Instructional Media Inc.) was a leading producer and distributor of many American documentary shorts shown in public schools, mostly in the 16mm format, from the 1940s through the 1980s (when the videocassette recorder replaced the motion picture projector as the key audio-visual aid). The company, whose library is owned and distributed by the Phoenix Learning Group, Inc., covered a wide range of subjects in zoology, science, geography, history and math, but is mostly remembered today for its post-World War II social-guidance films featuring topics such as dating, family life, courtesy and citizenship.

Overview
David A. Smart established the company with his brothers Alfred and John in 1934, but the first titles registered for copyright date from 1941 (beginning with Aptitudes and Occupations). Over time, a studio was set up in Glenview, Illinois. Smart was the publisher of Esquire and Coronet magazines, and the film company was named for the latter. The film company outlived the magazine; it ceased publication in 1976.

In addition to producing military instructional films during World War II, Coronet found success in its early years with its full-color films about common birds such as the ruby-throated hummingbird (a 1942 release), many of which were filmed by Olin Sewall Pettingill Jr. and Dr. Arthur A. Allen. One of the company's hallmarks was that many of its titles were shot in color Kodachrome a few years ahead of competing classroom-film companies. Production costs were controlled by selling both color and black-and-white prints and charging a much lower fee for the latter. As many school educators economized, fewer color prints are viewable today than are those in black and white.
 
After David Smart’s death in 1952, his brother John and Jack Abraham took over. The quantity of Coronet’s output had surpassed that of the classroom-film industry’s leader Encyclopædia Britannica Films (initially ERPI Classroom Films), with an 11-minute or longer film completed nearly every week. While its main rival strove for more cinematic films, the narration included in the 1950s and 1960s Coronet films was often of a dry and didactic tone. However, Coronet produced some well-made travelogues boasting good cinematography in addition to an annual quota of animal-related films. Starting in 1957, a Special Productions unit headed by Bob Kohl and Tom Riha added some more ambitious and prestigious independent productions to Coronet's more economically made catalog titles.

The 1970s were a creative period for the company, despite the fact that 16mm educational films were gradually replaced by video cassettes and computers as key audio-visual classroom tools a decade later. After Hal Kopel replaced Jack Abraham as general manager (around 1972), the look and style of the films received an upgrade and film credits included directors and creative personnel; most earlier films only credited educational consultants. This change was made in response to ongoing criticism that the Coronet films were too "stodgy and unimaginative." Many earlier titles were revised to reflect the higher production standards and changing audience expectations of the period.

By the early 1980s, Coronet was becoming more of a distributor of other companies' films than a producer of its own. Sheldon Sachs became vice president in 1979 and headed a Perspective Films division to increase Coronet's distribution of outside productions, making theatrical award winners like Sparky Greene's American Shoeshine available for classroom viewing. In 1981, Coronet acquired Centron Corporation.

Shortly after merging with MTI films in 1984, Coronet and its acquisitions were taken over by Gulf and Western Industries, but Kohl bought back Centron as a separate entity to run himself. Simon & Schuster, part of the conglomerate, moved the reduced filming facilities to New Jersey a decade later. In May 1997, Phoenix Learning Group took over the distribution rights to the Coronet catalog.

Personal-guidance films
Beginning with Shy Guy (1947), featuring an early appearance of a 19-year-old Dick York (later of Bewitched fame), the company gained considerable renewed attention for a cluster of "personal guidance" films created to instructing students in social matters. Typical titles include Are You Popular?, Everyday Courtesy and What to Do on a Date, along with the Korean War-period series Are You Ready for the Service?

Ted Peshak was a key director, although screen credits were often reserved only for psychology consultants. Many were filmed in color, but most extant copied are in black and white, as schools most often opted for the cheaper format. Most were made prior to David Smart’s death in 1952, but a few more were added as late as the 1970s, such as Beginning Responsibility: A Lunchroom Goes Bananas.

As most of the films were produced early in the postwar film boom, they were typical of the quality, production values and content of media of the period, and many considered them unintentionally humorous in the context of the post mid-1960s sexual revolution.

After the earliest films entered the public domain (a large percentage of the library is still privately owned), some of the films were recognized as kitsch, especially after a few became shorts for the television shows Pee-wee's Playhouse and Mystery Science Theater 3000 (MST3K), which mocked the films' production values and underlying messages. Shorts featured on MST3K include Are You Ready for Marriage? and What to Do on a Date. Many of Coronet's other films were later lampooned by Rifftrax, a company created by former MST3K cast member Michael J. Nelson.

In 1978, Coronet participated in a compilation spoof titled The Great American Student. Made by veteran director Mel Waskin and editor Bob Gronowski and lifting key scenes from the older films, it was distributed as would be any other educational film of the period as a joke on unsuspecting libraries. According to historian Geoff Alexander, it "is unique in the genre for its self-deprecating humor, and is a historical masterpiece."

Selected filmography

The following is a sample of prominent titles.

Production 
Select Coronet productions are now available as public-domain resources, such as:
Biography of a Red-winged Blackbird (1943) at Internet Archive
Mighty Columbia River (1947) at Internet Archive
Dating Do's and Dont's (1949) at Internet Archive

Communism (1952) at Dailymotion

References 

 Educational Film Guide 1954 H. W. Wilson Company 
 Motion Pictures 1912-1939 Catalog of Copyright Entries 1951 Library of Congress 
 Motion Pictures 1940-1949 Catalog of Copyright Entries 1953 Library of Congress 
 Motion Pictures 1950-1959 Catalog of Copyright Entries 1960 Library of Congress 
 Motion Pictures 1960-1969 Catalog of Copyright Entries 1971 Library of Congress

Notes

External links 
    
Simplified History of Educational Film Producers

Coronet Instructional Films on Worldcat
Coronet Films on RiffTrax

Defunct mass media companies of the United States
Non-theatrical film production companies
Social guidance films
Educational films
1934 establishments in the United States
American companies established in 1934
American companies disestablished in 1997
Mass media companies established in 1934
Mass media companies disestablished in 1997